Several bacterial species are named after Greek or Roman mythical figures.
The rules present for species named after a famous person do not apply, although some names are changed in the female nominative case, either by changing the ending to -a or to the diminutive -ella, depending on the name.

 Acidianus and Janibacter:     Janus, a god in Roman mythology with two faces.
 Amphritea:      Amphitrite ('Αμφιτρίτη), a sea-goddess and wife of Poseidon in Greek mythology and one of the 50 daughters of Nereus and Doris.
 Breoghania:     Breogán, the first mythical Celtic king of Gallaecia in Celtic mythology. 
 Chimaereicella:     Chimaera (Χίμαιρα), a Greek mythological monstrous fire-breathing female creature with the fore part a lion, in the hinder a serpent, and in the middle a goat.
 Cronobacter:     Cronos (Κρόνος), in Greco-Roman mythology leader of the Titans who swallowed each of his children as soon as they were born, excluding Zeus.
 Demetria:     Demeter, the Greek goddess of harvest.
 Ekhidna:     Echidna (Ἔχιδνα), a slimy woman/snake sea creature in Greek mythology.
 Eudoraea:     Eudora (Εὐδώρα), one of the Hyades in Greek mythology
 Haliea:     Halie (Ἁλίη), a sea nymph, also one of the 50 daughters of Nereus and Doris.
 Hellea:     Helle (Ἕλλη), a Greek sea goddess.
 Melitea:     Melite (Μελίτη), one of the naiads, daughter of the river god Aegaeus, and one of the many loves of Zeus and his son Heracles. Her son was Hylas.
 Neptuniibacter and Neptunomonas:     Neptunius, the Roman god of the sea, equivalent of the Greek Poseidon.
 Nereida:     A Nereid, which are sea nymphs daughters of Nereus.
 Nisaea:     Nicaea, a sea nymph and daughter of the river-god Sangarius and Cybele.
 Opitutus:     Ops, a Roman Earth and harvest goddess married to Saturn. Equivalent of the Greek Rhea.
 Pandoraea:     Pandora (Πανδώρα), the first woman who opened a jar, known as Pandora's box releasing evil into the world, in Greek mythology.
 Persephonella:     Persephone (also known as Kore), is the daughter of Zeus and the harvest goddess Demeter, and queen of the underworld; she was abducted by Hades the king of the underworld.
 Proteus and Thermoproteus:     Proteus (Πρωτεύς), an early sea-god able to change himself into different shapes.
 Telluria:     Tellus, a Roman goddess personifying the Earth.
 Vampirovibrio:     A vampire, mythological beings who subsist by feeding on the life essence of other creatures.
 Vulcanibacillus, Vulcanisaeta and  Vulcanithermus:     Vulcanus, the Roman god of fire.

See also 
 List of Archaea genera
 List of Bacteria genera
 List of bacterial genera named after geographical names
 List of bacterial genera named after institutions
 List of bacterial genera named after personal names
 List of bacterial orders
 List of clinically important bacteria
 List of Latin and Greek words commonly used in systematic names
 List of sequenced archaeal genomes
 List of sequenced prokaryotic genomes
 List of taxa named by anagrams
 LPSN, list of accepted bacterial and archaeal names
 Synonym (taxonomy)
 Taxonomy

References 
 

Bacteria genera